The 2010–11 season of the División de Plata de Balonmano is the 17th season of second-tier handball in Spain.

Final standings

Playoffs for promotion
The promotion playoffs will grant a seat in Liga ASOBAL for 2011–12 season.

Semifinals

Third place

Final

External links
Regular season
Playoffs for promotion

División de Plata de Balonmano seasons
2010–11 in Spanish handball